Aut'Chose is a Canadian garage rock group from Montreal, Quebec, first active in the 1970s.

History

Led by poet Lucien Francoeur, the band's original lineup featured a rotating collective of musicians including Pierre-André Gauthier, Jacques Racine, Mick Gauthier, Jacques Lalumière and Jean-François St-Georges. This group released three albums, Prends Une Chance Avec Moé (1974), Une Nuit Comme Une Autre (1975), and Le Cauchemar Américain (1976).

The band broke up in 1976, just weeks after the release of Le Cauchemar Américain. They were still nominated for Most Promising New Group at the Juno Awards of 1976.

The compilation Chaud Comme un Juke Box was released in France in 1977, and the compilation *Encore (1981) was released in Canada in 1981.

Francoeur continued to record and perform as a solo artist, and was noted for his single "Le Rap-à-Billy", which was credited as the first French Canadian rap single. He also continued to publish work as a poet, winning the Prix Émile-Nelligan in 1983 for his poetry collection Les Rockeurs Sanctifiés.

In 2001, Francoeur and Pierre Gauthier released an acoustic album of Aut'Chose songs, Dans La Jungle Des Villes.

Revival
In 2004, Francoeur revived the band for a 30th anniversary show. Original members Francoeur and Racine were supported by Michel Langevin and Denis D'Amour of Voïvod, Vincent Peake of Groovy Aardvark and Joe Evil of Grimskunk. The same lineup released a reunion album, Chansons D'Épouvante in 2005.

All four of their studio albums and a concert DVD were re-released in 2014 as the box set Chaud Comme un Juke Box, L'Intégrale.

The band continues to perform, playing together as late as 2019.

Discography

Albums
Prends Une Chance Avec Moé (1974), Columbia, CBS
Une Nuit Comme Une Autre (1975), CBS
Le Cauchemar Américain (1976), CBS
Dans La Jungle Des Villes (2001), Star Records (Star Music)
Chansons D'Épouvante (2005), Disques Artic

Compilations
Chaud Comme un Juke Box (1977), CBS
Encore (1981), CBS
Chaud Comme un Juke Box, L'Intégrale (2014), Amusic

Singles
"Ch'T'aime Pi Ch'T'En Veux" / "Hey You Woman" (1974), CBS
"Sexe-Fiction" / "Prends Une Chance Avec Moé" (1975), CBS
"Nancy Beaudoin" (1975), CBS
"Ambulance Francoeur" / "Blue Jeans Sur La Plage" (1975), CBS
"Le P'tit Gros" / "Les Pays D'en Haut" (1976), CBS
"Le Rock-A-L'ecole" / "Ben Dans Ma Peau" (1982), Hasard Records

References

Canadian garage rock groups
Musical groups established in 1974
Musical groups from Montreal
Musical groups disestablished in 1977
Musical groups reestablished in 2014